is a Japanese composer, arranger, conductor and singer-songwriter. He is affiliated with the music production company Imagine. He has created numerous musical scores for anime television series, OVAs, films, video games and tokusatsu series including Gunbuster, Sakura Wars and One Piece.

Biography

Tanaka was a student at Berklee College of Music. While employed playing the piano in a hotel lounge, he was requested to arrange a song in Arcadia of My Youth: Endless Orbit SSX, a 1982 TV anime, and it became his first work as a composer. Afterwards, he produced some songs and arrangements for the Super Sentai series and his first work as a lead composer was for the television anime Konpora Kids in 1985.

Notably, the background music in Gunbuster made his name and talent very famous among anime fans and is recognized as one of his most important works. He also handled the composition of Diebuster, a sequel series of Gunbuster, and showed a peculiar arrangement to his own work 17 years ago.

He hosted the Dai Anime Hakurankai radio show on Tokai Radio together with the voice actress Konami Yoshida from April 1993 to September 1994. His discussions with Toshio Okada and Hiroshi Yamamoto about anime, originally published in the hm3 voice acting magazine, have been republished in book form.

On February 14, 2008, he opened an official website and announced his intention to work also as a singer in the future. On July 4, he released his first solo album called Kokorone song 1st.

Works

Anime

Films

Video games

See also
 List of video game musicians

References

External links
 http://ameblo.jp/kenokun/ 

1954 births
Anime composers
Berklee College of Music alumni 
Japanese composers
Japanese conductors (music)
Japanese film score composers
Japanese male composers
Japanese male conductors (music)
Japanese male film score composers
Living people
Musicians from Osaka
Tokyo University of the Arts alumni
Video game composers